Simpson is a village in Johnson County, Illinois, United States. The population was 60 at the 2010 census.

Geography
Simpson is located in eastern Johnson County at  (37.467977, -88.756277), in the valley of Cedar Creek, a south-flowing tributary of Bay Creek and part of the Ohio River watershed. Illinois Route 147 passes through the village, leading southwest  to Vienna, the county seat, and east  to its terminus at Glendale.

Demographics

As of the census of 2000, there were 54 people, 21 households, and 17 families residing in the village. The racial makeup of the village was 88.89% White, 7.41% African American, 1.85% Native American, 1.85% from other races. Hispanic or Latino of any race were 9.26% of the population.

There were 21 households, out of which 42.9% had children under the age of 18 living with them, 66.7% were married couples living together, 9.5% had a female householder with no husband present, and 19.0% were non-families. 19.0% of all households were made up of individuals, and 4.8% had someone living alone who was 65 years of age or older. The average household size was 2.57 and the average family size was 2.88.

In the village, the population was spread out, with 27.8% under the age of 18, 14.8% from 18 to 24, 22.2% from 25 to 44, 25.9% from 45 to 64, and 9.3% who were 65 years of age or older. The median age was 34 years. For every 100 females, there were 107.7 males. For every 100 females age 18 and over, there were 85.7 males.

The median income for a household in the village was $23,125, and the median income for a family was $41,250. Males had a median income of $16,563 versus $18,125 for females. The per capita income for the village was $13,325. There were no families and 7.0% of the population living below the poverty line, including no under eighteens and none of those over 64.

References

Villages in Johnson County, Illinois
Villages in Illinois